Fernand Edmond Jean Marie Khnopff (12 September 1858 – 12 November 1921) was a Belgian symbolist painter.

Life

Youth and training

Fernand Khnopff was born to a wealthy family that was part of the high bourgeoisie for generations. Khnopff's ancestors had lived in the Vossenhoek area of Grembergen Flanders since the early 17th century but were of Austrian and Portuguese descent. Most male members of his family had been lawyers or judges, and young Fernand was destined for a juridical career. In his early childhood (1859–1864), he lived in Bruges where his father was appointed Substitut Du Procureur Du Roi. His childhood memories of the medieval city of Bruges would play a significant role in his later work. In 1864, the family moved to Brussels. In his childhood Khnopff spent part of his summer holidays in the hamlet of Tillet not so far from Bastogne in the Luxemburg province where his maternal grandparents owned an estate. He painted several views of this village.

To please his parents, he went to law school at the Free University of Brussels (now divided into the Université Libre de Bruxelles and the Vrije Universiteit Brussel) when he was 18 years old. During this period, he developed a passion for literature, discovering the works of Baudelaire, Flaubert, Leconte de Lisle and other mostly French authors. With his younger brother Georges Khnopff – also a passionate amateur of contemporary music and poetry – he started to frequent Jeune Belgique ("Young Belgium"), a group of young writers including Max Waller, Georges Rodenbach, Iwan Gilkin, and Emile Verhaeren.

Khnopff left University due to a lack of interest in his law studies and began to frequent the studio of Xavier Mellery, who made him familiar with the art of painting. On 25 October 1876, he enrolled for the Cours De Dessin Après Nature ("course of drawing after nature") at the Académie Royale des Beaux-Arts. At the Académie, his most famous fellow student was James Ensor, whom he disliked from the start. Between 1877 and 1880, Khnopff made several trips to Paris where he discovered the work of Delacroix, Ingres, Moreau and Stevens. At the Paris World Fair of 1878 he became acquainted with the oeuvre of Millais and Burne-Jones. During his last year at the Académie in 1878–1879 he neglected his classes in Brussels and lived for a while in Passy, where he visited the Cours Libres of Jules Joseph Lefebvre at the Académie Julian.

Early career with Les XX

In 1881, he presented his works to the public for the first time at the "Salon de l'Essor" in Brussels. The critics' appraisal of his work is very harsh, with the exception of Emile Verhaeren who wrote a commending review. Verhaeren would remain a lifelong supporter and would write the first monograph on the painter. In 1883, Khnopff was one of the founding members of the group Le Groupe des XX. Khnopff exhibited regularly at the annual "Salon" organised by Les XX.
In 1885, he met the French writer Joséphin Péladan the future grandmaster of the Rosicrucian "Ordre de la Rose + Croix". Péladan asked Khnopff to design the cover for his new novel Le Vice suprême. Khnopff accepted this commission but destroyed the work later because the famous soprano Rose Caron was offended by the imaginary portrait of Leonora d'Este (a character in Péladan's Le Vice suprême) that Khnopff had designed to adorn the cover and in which Caron thought to recognise her own face. The vehement reaction of "La Caron" on this occasion made a scandal in the Belgian and Parisian press and would help to establish Khnopff's name as an artist. Khnopff continued to design illustrations for the works of Péladan, most notably for Femmes honnêtes (1888) and Le Panthée (1892). On several occasions (1892, 1893, 1894 and 1897) Khnopff was invited as guest of honour on the exhibitions of the Parisian "Salon de la Rose + Croix" organised by Péladan.

Later years
In 1889, Khnopff laid his first contacts with England, where he would stay and exhibit regularly in the future. British artists such as Hunt, Watts, Rossetti, Brown and Burne-Jones would become friends. From 1895 Khnopff worked as a correspondent for the British art journal The Studio. Until the outbreak of World War I in 1914 Khnopff would be responsible for the rubric "Studio-Talks-Brussels" in which he reported about the artistic evolutions in Belgium and continental Europe. In March 1898 Khnopff presented a selection of 21 works on the first exhibition of the Vienna Secession. In Vienna his work was received with massive admiration. The works he presented at the Secession would form a major influence on the oeuvre of Gustav Klimt.

From 1900 onwards, Khnopff was engaged in the design of his new home and studio in Brussels (demolished). The house was inspired by the Vienna Secession and more in particular by the architecture of Joseph Maria Olbrich. To the sober architecture and decoration Khnopff added a highly symbolic, spatial and decorative concept that turned his home into a "Temple of the self". The house functioned as a shrine in which the genius of the painter could flourish. His motto "On a que soi" (One has but oneself) was inscribed above the entrance door, in and his studio he painted in the middle of golden circle inscribed on the white mosaic floor. This almost theatrical setting was undoubtedly a reflection of Khnopffs passion for theatre and opera. Khnopff's first designs for the theatre date from 1903 when he sketched the sets for a production of Georges Rodenbach's play  "Le Mirage" at the Deutsches Theater Berlin. This production was directed by the famous Max Reinhardt, and the sets evoking the gloomy streets of the mysterious city of Bruges where Khnopff had spent his early childhood, were much appreciated by the Berlin public and critics. After Khnopff had been engaged to design the costumes and the sets for the World premiere of Ernest Chausson's opera Le Roi Arthus at the Théâtre Royal de la Monnaie in Brussels in 1903, he collaborated on more than a dozen opera productions given at "La Monnaie" in the following decade. In 1904 the city council of Saint Gilles commissioned him to decorate the ceilings of the "Salle des Marriages" (Wedding Room) of the new Town Hall, and in the same year he was approached by the wealthy banker Adolphe Stoclet to design decorative panels for the music room of the Palais Stoclet. Here Khnopff came in touch again with prominent artists from the Vienna Secession; the architect of the Palais Stoclet Josef Hoffmann, and Gustav Klimt who had designed a decorative mosaic for its dining room.

Although not a very open man and a rather secluded personality, he already achieved cult status during his life. Acknowledged and accepted, he received the Order of Leopold. His sister, Marguerite, was one of his favorite subjects. His most famous painting is probably The Caress ("L'Art ou Des Caresses"). His art often portrayed a recurring theme found in symbolist art: the dualistic vision of woman as either 'femme fatale' or angelic woman.

Khnopff is buried in Laeken Cemetery.

Honours
 1919 : Commander of the Order of Leopold.
 Member of the Royal Academy of Science, Letters and Fine Arts of Belgium.
2021: Painting used as a Twitter avatar by rapper Bladee
 A street in Grembergen (Belgium) is named after him: "Fernand Khnopffstraat"

List of some works in public collections

The numbers accompanied by the abbreviation: "dCOZ" refer to the catalogue of the works of Khnopff by Catherine de Croës and Gisèle Ollinger-Zinque (1987). See bibliographie.
The titles between quotation marks are the original titles given by Khnopff himself.

Amsterdam, Van Gogh Museum
Portrait of the violinist Achille Lerminiaux, 1885. (dCOZ 75)
Antwerp, Koninklijk Museum voor Schone Kunsten Antwerpen:
Portrait of Edmond Khnopff, father of the painter, 1881. (dCOZ 33)
Bruges, Groeningemuseum
"Secret-Reflect" (Secret-Reflection), 1902. (dCOZ 378)
Brussels, Royal Museums of Fine Arts of Belgium:
"En écoutant Schumann" (listening to Schumann), 1883. (dCOZ 52)
"Portrait of Marguerite Khnopff", sister of the painter, 1887. (dCOZ 100)
"Du silence" (Silence), 1890. (dCOZ 151)
"A Fosset, sous les sapins" (In Fosset, under the firs), 1894. (dCOZ 242)
"Caress of the Sphinx", 1896. (dCOZ 275)
"Memories" or "Lawn Tennis", 1889. (dCOZ 131)
"Posthumous portrait of Marguerite Landuyt", 1896. (dCOZ 280)
"Portrait of His Royal Highness" Prince Leopold of Belgium, 1912. (dCOZ 499)
"Portrait of Miss Van der Hecht", 1883. (dCOZ 57)
"Portrait of Germaine Wiener, 1893. (dCOZ 237)
"Blanc, noir et or" (White, black and gold), 1901. (dCOZ 365)
"Un masque de jeune femme anglaise" (A mask of a young English woman), 1891. (dCOZ 181)
"Sculpture (bust) in polychromed plaster".
"Sous les arbres" (Under the trees), 1894. (dCOZ 253)
"Une ville abandonnée" (An abandoned city), 1904. (dCOZ 401)
Brussels, Collection of the BOZAR:
"Portrait of a man", ca. 1885. (dCOZ 89)
Budapest, Museum of Fine Arts:
"À Fosset, Un ruisseau" (In Fosset, A brook), 1897. (dCOZ 285)
Dendermonde, Stedelijke Musea:
"Paysage à Fosset", ca. 1894. (dCOZ 254)
Elsene/Ixelles, Musée d'Ixelles/Museum van Elsene:
"Portrait of Charles Maus" (father of Octave Maus, secretary of Les XX), 1885. (dCOZ 84)
"Chimère" (Chimaera), ca. 1910. (dCOZ 470)
Frankfurt-am-Main, Städelsches Kunstinstitut und Städtische Galerie:
"À Fosset, Le garde qui attend" (In Fosset, The forester who waits), 1883. (dCOZ 49)
Ghent, Museum of Fine Arts, Ghent:
"L'Encens" (incense), ca. 1898. (dCOZ 325)
"A Fosset, Un sentier" (In Fosset, a track), ca. 1890–'95. (dCOZ 170)
"Des yeux bruns et une fleur bleue", 1905. (dCOZ 415)
Hamburg, Kunsthalle Hamburg:
"Un Masque" (A mask), 1897. (dCOZ 299) Sculpture in polychromed plaster.
Liège, Musée d'art moderne et d'art contemporain:
"Portrait of the mother of the artist, 1882. (dCOZ 39)
"Orphée" (Orpheus), 1913. (dCOZ 519)
"l'Isolement" ("The Isolation", part I and part III of a triptych consisting of: "Acrasia", "Solitude" and "Brittomart"), ca. 1890–1894. Part II, "Solitude" is not in Liège but property of the Neumann Foundation in Gingins.
"Les cheveux" (Hair), 1892. (dCOZ 218bis)

Los Angeles, J. Paul Getty Museum:
"Portrait of Jeanne Kéfer, 1885. (dCOZ 82)
Munich, Bayerische Staatsgemäldesammlungen, Neue Pinakothek:
"I lock my door upon myself", 1891. (dCOZ 174)
Neuss, Clemens Sels Museum:
"A Bruges, un portail" (In Bruges, a portal), ca. 1904. (dCOZ 405)
New York City, Metropolitan Museum of Art
"l'Offrande" (The offering), 1891. (dCOZ 187)
Ostend, Museum voor Schone Kunsten:
"View from the bridge at Fosset, ca. 1882–1883. (dCOZ, 41bis)
Paris, Musée d'Orsay:
"Portrait of Marie Monnom (Later wife of Théo van Rysselberghe), 1887. (dCOZ 98)
Verviers, Musées Communaux:
"A Bruges, une église" (In Bruges, a church), 1904. (dCOZ 393)
Vienna, Österreichische Galerie Belvedere:
"l'Eau immobile" (The immobile water), ca. 1894. (dCOZ 247)
Vienna, Graphische Sammlung Albertina:
"Tête de jeune femme anglaise" (Head of a young English woman), 1895. (dCOZ 265) Drawing in red chalk.

References

Sources
P. & V. Berko, "Dictionary of Belgian painters born between 1750 & 1875", Knokke 1981, p. 387–389.
P. & V. Berko, "19th Century European Virtuoso Painters", Knokke 2011, p. 506, illustrations p. 138, 140, 142–143.
Emile Verhaeren, Quelques notes sur l'oeuvre de Fernand Khnopff, Brussels, Editions Veuve Monnom, 1887.
Fernand Khnopff 1858–1921, Exhibition Catalogue: Paris, Musée des Arts décoratifs; Brussels, Royal Museums for Fine Arts of Belgium; Hamburg, Hamburger Kunsthalle, 1979–1980.
Robert L. Delevoy, Catherine de Croës, Gisèle Ollinger-Zinque, Fernand Khnopff, (with a catalogue of works by C. de Croës and G. Ollinger-Zinque and essays by R.L.Delevoy), Brussels, Lebeer-Hossmann, 1987. (2nd revised and augmented edition).
Fernand Khnopff et ses rapports avec la Secession Viennoise, Exhibition Catalogue: Brussels, Royal Museums for Fine Arts of Belgium, 1987.
Jeffery Howe, The Symbolist Art of Fernand Khnopff, Ann Arbor, UMI Research Press, 1982.
Michel Draguet, Khnopff, ou l’ambigu poétique, Brussels, Crédit communal; Paris, Flammarion, 1995.
Fernand Khnopff (1858–1921), Exhibition Catalogue: Brussels, Royal Museums for Fine Arts of Belgium; Salzburg, Museum der Moderne; Boston, McMullen Museum of Art, Brussel, 2003–2004. (With essays by: Frederik Leen, Jeffery Howe, Dominique Marechal, Laurent Busine, Michael Sagroske, Joris Van Grieken, Anne Adriaens-Pannier and Sophie Van Vliet.)
 Emile Pirard. Fernand Khnopff (1858–1921) à Fosset, Ménil, Sprimont, Hérompont. Tapuscrit, 105pp A4. Tillet 2012.

External links

 Fernand Khnopff – I Lock the Door Upon Myself at Arcadian Dreams 
 Exhibition Review of 'Fernand Khnopff (1858–1921)' (Nineteenth-Century Art Worldwide)
 Obsession: My Lifetime with Fernand Khnopff (Jeffery Howe) 
 Villa Khnopff (ArtMagick)
 Ten Dreams Galleries

1858 births
1921 deaths
Belgian Symbolist painters
Académie Julian alumni
Belgian printmakers
Burials at Laeken Cemetery
Members of the Royal Academy of Belgium
Officiers of the Légion d'honneur
19th-century Belgian painters
19th-century Belgian male artists
20th-century Belgian painters
20th-century printmakers
Académie Royale des Beaux-Arts alumni
20th-century Belgian male artists